Maria Wiłkomirska (3 April 1904 - 19 June 1995) was a Polish pianist.

Born in Moscow, Wiłkomirska was the daughter of violinist Alfred Wiłkomirski; her half-sister Wanda was a violinist, her half-brother Józef was a conductor, and her brother Kazimierz was a cellist. From 1913 until 1917 she studied at the Moscow Conservatory under  and Boleslav Yavorsky; in 1920 she moved to Warsaw where she became a pupil of Józef Turczyński. She held positions as an instructor in Kalisz, Gdańsk, and Łódź, and in 1951 began teaching at the Chopin University of Music in Warsaw. Wiłkomirska formed a piano trio with Wanda and Kazimierz and toured in Europe and Asia.

References

1904 births
1995 deaths
Polish women pianists
Polish classical pianists
20th-century Polish musicians
20th-century classical pianists
Musicians from Moscow
Academic staff of the Chopin University of Music
20th-century Polish women
20th-century women pianists